Donald H. Clark (born 1930 in New Jersey) is an American writer, teacher, consultant and clinical psychologist who has specialized in group and individual work with gay people since 1968. His writing includes fiction, textbooks, and articles for both professional journals and popular magazines. He is the author of the best-selling book, Loving Someone Gay, now in its fifth edition, as well as its Spanish-language edition Amar a Alguien Gay, Someone Gay: Memoirs, Living Gay and As We Are.

Career 
Clark received a B.A. in psychology from Antioch College in 1953 and a PhD in psychology from Adelphi University in 1959. He also served in the U.S. Army Medical Corps, Scientific and Professional Personnel. He served on the faculty of Hunter College and the City University of New York. He published a report for the Carnegie Corporation of New York about the Human Potential Movement.

He has been a member of the Governing Boards of the Saybrook Institute and the Gay Rights Advocates, a Fellow of the American Psychological Association, and a California Board of Psychology Commissioner, among other roles.

From 1971 to his retirement in 2007, he held a private practice in San Francisco, California.

References

External links 
Don Clark's website

1930 births
Living people
21st-century American psychologists
Antioch College alumni
Adelphi University alumni
Hunter College faculty
United States Army Medical Corps officers
Fellows of the American Psychological Association
20th-century American psychologists